Asava Sundar Swapnancha Bangla is an Indian Marathi-language television drama series which aired on Colors Marathi. The show starred Rashmi Anpat, Juhi Patwardhan and Suhrud Wardekar in lead roles. The series premiered from 7 January 2013 and ended on 19 March 2016 completing 998 episodes. The show is an official remake of Colors TV's Hindi series Uttaran.

Cast 
 Rashmi Anpat as Ishwari
 Mrunmayee Supal as child Ishwari
 Suhrud Wardekar as Aarav
 Juhi Patwardhan as Ankita
 Sakshi Tisgaonkar as child Ankita
 Pushkar Jog
 Ravindra Mahajani
 Ajinkya Deo
 Shailesh Datar
 Aanand Kale
 Mitali Jagtap-Varadkar
 Sushant Shelar
 Sanyogita Bhave
 Ajinkya Nanaware
 Prasad Limaye
 Shweta Mehendale
 Surabhi Bhave-Damle
 Vanashree Joshi-Pande

Adaptations

Reception

Airing history

References

External links 
 
 Asava Sundar Swapnancha Bangla at Voot
 
2013 Indian television series debuts
Colors Marathi original programming
Marathi-language television shows
2016 Indian television series endings